David S. Barnes is an Associate Professor of History and Sociology of Science and Director of the Health and Societies Program at the University of Pennsylvania. He is a historian specializing in public health issues of Third Republic France.  He argues that the development of public health in nineteenth-century France is best understood in terms of the integration of scientific hypotheses into the generally accepted cultural, social and economic frameworks.

Works

Books (with selected reviews)
Barnes, David S., The Making of a Social Disease: Tuberculosis in Nineteenth-Century France; University of California Press, 1995.  in 606 WorldCat libraries 
Review: by Ann F La Berge  The American historical review. 101, no. 3, (1996): 854
Review: by Robert A. Nye Bulletin of the History of Medicine - Volume 70, Number 3, Fall 1996, pp. 528–529
Review: by  Anne HardyMedical history. 40, no. 2, (1996): 255
Review: by Allan Mitchell: Isis. 86, no. 3, (1995): 507
Review by Olivier Faure The Journal of Modern History. 69, no. 1, (1997): 158
Review: by Patricia E Prestwick Journal of Social History. 29, no. 4, (1996): 974
Barnes, David S., The Great Stink of Paris and the Nineteenth-Century Struggle against Filth and Germs; The Johns Hopkins University Press; Oxford University Press, 2006  held in 339 WorldCat libraries 
Review  by B. Gastel - 9 Nov, 2006 New England Journal of Medicine  355 (19): 2051  november 9, 2006.
Review:  by Ann F La Berge JAMA : the journal of the American Medical Association 297, no. 19, (2007): 2144
Review: by H Pennington Science (magazine) 313, no. 5794, (September 22, 2006): 1740
Review:   by Margaret K. Hostetter .Journal of Clinical Investigation. 116(11): 2835-2835 (2006).
Review  by Elizabeth A Williams  Journal of the History of Medicine and Allied Sciences, 63, no. 1 (2008): 117-119
Review: by R Lethbridge Journal of European Studies. 2007; 37: 200-202 
Review: by O Amsterdamska Isis (journal) 98, no. 3, (2007): 638 
Review: by Hope Christiansen The French review. 81, no. 4, (2008): 801 
Review by S Sauget. Revue d'histoire moderne et contemporaine , 55, no. 1, (2008): 215-216

Articles
"Wald, Contagious: Cultures, Carriers, and the Outbreak Narrative". The Journal of American History. 96, no. 2: 589-.
Contagion: Disease, Government, and the Social Question in Nineteenth-Century France (Review)". Journal of the History of Medicine and Allied Sciences. 55, no. 3: 316-318.

References

University of Pennsylvania faculty
Living people
21st-century American historians
21st-century American male writers
Year of birth missing (living people)
American male non-fiction writers